Enright is a ghost town in Brazos County, in the U.S. state of Texas. It is located within the Bryan-College Station metropolitan area.

History
Enright began as a railroad stop on the International-Great Northern Railroad in the early 1900s. County maps showed only several scattered houses and a quarry in the area in the 1930s. It never had a population recorded.

Geography

Education
Today, Enright is located within the College Station Independent School District.

References

Ghost towns in Texas